Devil's Dozen is the thirteenth studio album by  power/progressive metal band Royal Hunt. This was released on 21 August 2015 via Frontiers Music Srl.

Track listing
All songs are written by Andre Andersen.

 So Right So Wrong (7:21)
 May You Never (Walk Alone) (7:29)
 Heart on a Platter (6:52)
 A Tear in the Rain (5:49)
 Until the Day (6:36)
 Riches to Rags (5:45)
 Way Too Late (6:37)
 How Do You Know (bonus track)(3:16)

Personnel
Production and performance credits are adapted from the album liner notes.

Royal Hunt
 D.C. Cooper - vocals
 Andre Andersen - keyboards
 Andreas Passmark - bass
 Jonas Larsen - guitars
 Andreas Habo Johansson - drums

Additional musicians
 Andreas "Habo" Johansson - drums
 Kenny Lubcke - backing vocals
 Alexandra Popova - backing vocals
 Christina Lund - strings
 Patricia Skovgaard - strings 
 Christina Larsen - strings
 Henrik Sorensen - brass/woodwinds
 Mads Kofoed - brass/woodwinds

References

Royal Hunt albums
2015 albums